This is a list of football clubs in Hungary:

Nemzeti Bajnokság I
As of 14 August 2017

Nemzeti Bajnokság II

Eastern Group

Western Group

Nemzeti Bajnokság III

Alföld Group

Bakony Group

Dráva Group

Duna Group

Mátra Group

Tisza Group

Other clubs
Other clubs, which competed in the First division earlier, but now are defunct, or play in lower leagues, include:

 Budapesti AK
 MFC Sopron
 BVSC
 Volán FC

Clubs outside present-day Hungary
Clubs, which were either established in Hungary, or competed in Hungarian leagues before the Treaty of Trianon, or after the First and Second Vienna Awards, include:

 Nagyváradi AC (won the Nemzeti Bajnokság I in 1943/44, winners of Hungarian Eastern division league 1912/13)
 Kolozsvári AC (defunct - competed in the Nemzeti Bajnokság I from 1941 to 1944; bronze medalists in 1943/44, cup finalists in 1944)
 Kassai AC (defunct - competed in the Nemzeti Bajnokság I in 1939/40, winners of Hungarian Northern division league 1908/09, 1909/10, 1910/11, 1912/13 and the national regional final 1909, 1911)
 Újvidéki AC (defunct - competed in the Nemzeti Bajnokság I from 1941 to 1944)
 Ungvári AC (defunct - competed in the Nemzeti Bajnokság I in 1944)
 Temesvári Kinizsi (defunct - winners of Hungarian Southern division league 1916/17, 1917/18)
 Bácska Szabadkai AC (winners of Hungarian Southern division league 1908/09, 1909/10, 1912/13)
 Szabadkai Vasutas AC (defunct)
 Eperjesi TVE (winners of Hungarian Northern division league 1907/08)
 Homonnai AC
 Kolozsvári VSC (competed in the Nemzeti Bajnokság II from 1941 to 1944 as Kolozsvári MÁV)
 Nagyszalontai AC (competed in Nemzeti Bajnokság II between 1940 and 1944)
 Dunaszerdahelyi AC
 Nagybányai Phönix
 Nyitrai TVE
 Rimaszombat
 Losonci AFC (competed in Nemzeti Bajnokság II between 1940 and 1944)
 SK Rusj (competed in Nemzeti Bajnokság II between 1940 and 1944)
 Zsolnai TK
 Pozsonyi TE (the first non-Budapest club to give a player - Gyula Nirnsee - to the Hungarian national team in 1907)

See also

Hungary national football team
Hungarian Football Federation

References 

 
Hungary
clubs
Football